Bongioanni is an Italian surname. Notable people with the surname include:

Federico Bongioanni (born 1978), Argentine footballer
Gianni Bongioanni (1921–2018), Italian film director, screenwriter, cinematographer, camera operator, editor, writer, and actor

Italian-language surnames